is a Japanese manga series written and illustrated by Minoru Furuya. It was serialized in Kodansha's seinen manga magazine Weekly Young Magazine from 1993 to 1996, with its chapters collected in 13 tankōbon volumes. It is about the dysfunctional members of a middle school ping-pong club.

The Ping Pong Club was adapted by Grouper Productions into a 26-episode anime television series. It was licensed in North America by Central Park Media. 

As of September 2010, The Ping Pong Club had over 25 million copies in circulation, making it one of the best-selling manga series. In 1996, the manga won the 20th Kodansha Manga Award for the general category.

Plot
The story follows the adventures of a somewhat unusual ping-pong club: the players are indeed more focused "on panties" and obscene jokes than on the game. The arrival of Iwashita, the new head of the club, makes it possible to change things, the latter somehow managing to interest his undisciplined players in ping-pong. A difficult mission as the temptations of the outside world are great for our protagonists.

Characters
 Maeno

Somewhat the 'leader' of the Ping Pong Club. He has a strange demeanor and enjoys any conversation or subject involving his glorious 'ass', of which he is very proud. Contrary to the belief that his strange and perverted attitude would repel girls, it actually attracts them (as well as his good friend Izawa).
 Hiromi Izawa

Izawa's strange hairstyle is constantly the 'butt' of many a joke in the series. He is a kind and caring person, although quite perverted at times, and he lives his life by the laws of chivalry. He is a huge boxing fan and wears his shoulder length hair in the style of Joe Yabuki from the popular manga Ashita no Joe. He and Maeno constantly play little games in which Izawa almost always acts as the woman, be it a mother, child, or love interest. His relationship with Maeno can be debated. He is pretty much Maeno's very close friend but he has a very strange adversity to Maeno's getting a girlfriend and he even went so far as to dress up as a woman to repel Maeno's soon-to-be lover. He is also the only one in the show who has freckles.
 Takeda

One of ping-pong club's two 'pretty boys'. Takeda has a bowl haircut with short bangs, and he is also the crush of female character Kyōko. He even has a whole episode devoted to him fondling her breasts (in which Maeno, Izawa, and Tanaka are all hiding naked in a locker).
 Yūsuke Kinoshita

The quintessential "pretty boy" out of the two in the ping-pong club. He, like Izawa, has hair down to his shoulders and is the most popular and cool guy in the whole school, constantly having girls chase after him. In one episode however, Maeno and Izawa dress him like a girl and it's now Tanaka who's chasing after him. In the English dub of the series, Kinoshita is shown as having a slacker 'surfer-boy' accent.
 Tanaka
 
A tiny little pervert coming from a long line of "Panty Masters". Under his clothes, he has a very shapely feminine body that is mistaken for that of a girl's from the back in an episode. He is constantly tricked into playing along with Maeno and Izawa's schemes. He also constantly refers to girls he likes as "Mommy".
 Mitchell Gorō Tanabe

Half American and half Japanese. Hairy, blond, and blue-eyed, Tanabe is always looking out for people in trouble and for ways to help his good friend, Tanaka. He is gentle and helpful as well as being very sensitive. He is known for his exponential stench and bad B.O. The only thing that has been able to destroy his horrible smell is pool disinfectant.
 Kyōko Iwashita

She's a tough-as-nails, and landed the managerial job because the principal of the school hoped it would be a way to keep her out of trouble. She barely tolerates the antics of the room of adolescent boys trying constantly to get in her panties. In the episode "the Burning Spirit," she proves to have incredible motivational skills for the boys when she offers a "sex pass" to the best player on the team: "The holder of this pass can do anything they want with my body for a month!" The offer powers the below mediocre team into the city finals.
 Chiyoko Kamiya

Shows up in later episodes as a shy girl who has a crush on Kinoshita, and figures if she can improve her ping pong skills, she'll catch his eye. A good plan, but her mistake is going to nerdy freak Izawa to unquestioningly enlist him as her ping pong sensei. Izawa's fondest dream is to have a beautiful girl that obeys his every word, and not abusing his new-found position of power proves to be impossible.

Media

Manga
Written and illustrated by Minoru Furuya, The Ping Pong Club was serialized in Kodansha's seinen manga magazine Weekly Young Magazine from 1993 to 1996. Kodansha collected its chapters in thirteen tankōbon volumes, released from November 6, 1993, to February 6, 1997.

Volume list

Anime
A 26-episode (consisting of two segments each) anime television series adaptation, animated by Grouper Productions, was broadcast in Japan on TBS from April 6 to September 28, 1995.

In North America, the series was licensed by Central Park Media and released under their Software Sculptors label. The series had first a sub only release on VHS starting in 1999. It was later released with an English dub on five DVDs, starting from the fourth volume, released on October 9, 2001; the fifth volume was released on December 11, 2001, and the first to third DVDs were released from August 13 to December 3, 2002. A DVD box collection was released on December 3, 2002.

Episode list

Reception
As of September 2010, the manga had over 25 million copies in circulation. In 1996, the manga won the 20th Kodansha Manga Award for general manga.

References

External links
 

1993 manga
1995 anime television series debuts
Central Park Media
Comedy anime and manga
Kodansha manga
School life in anime and manga
Seinen manga
Table tennis in anime and manga
TBS Television (Japan) original programming
Winner of Kodansha Manga Award (General)
Wonderful (TV programming block)